Paratyndaris is a genus of beetles in the family Buprestidae, containing the following species:

 Paratyndaris acaciae Knull, 1937
 Paratyndaris albofasciata Knull, 1937
 Paratyndaris anomalis Knull, 1937
 Paratyndaris antillarum Fisher, 1940
 Paratyndaris barberi (Skinner, 1903)
 Paratyndaris chamaeleonis (Skinner, 1903)
 Paratyndaris cincta (Horn, 1885)
 Paratyndaris costata Nelson & Bellamy, 2004
 Paratyndaris coursetiae Fisher, 1919
 Paratyndaris crandalli Knull, 1941
 Paratyndaris dozieri Nelson & Bellamy, 2004
 Paratyndaris equihuai Westcott, 2000
 Paratyndaris grassmani Parker, 1947
 Paratyndaris knulli (Barr, 1972)
 Paratyndaris lateralis (Barr, 1972)
 Paratyndaris mexicana Fisher, 1933
 Paratyndaris mimica Nelson & Bellamy, 2004
 Paratyndaris mojito (Bílý, 1987)
 Paratyndaris nelsoni (Barr, 1972)
 Paratyndaris olneyae (Skinner, 1903)
 Paratyndaris paralateralis Nelson & Bellamy, 2004
 Paratyndaris peninsularis Westcott, 2000
 Paratyndaris prosopis (Skinner, 1903)
 Paratyndaris pulchra Nelson & Bellamy, 2004
 Paratyndaris quadrinotata Knull, 1938
 Paratyndaris robusta (Dozier, 1988)
 Paratyndaris similis Nelson & Bellamy, 2004
 Paratyndaris subcostata (Barr, 1972)
 Paratyndaris suturalis Fall, 1934
 Paratyndaris trilobata Westcott, 2000
 Paratyndaris tucsoni Knull, 1938
 Paratyndaris turbida Nelson & Bellamy, 2004
 Paratyndaris uniformis Nelson & Bellamy, 2004
 Paratyndaris variabilis Westcott, 2000
 Paratyndaris verityi Nelson & Bellamy, 2004
 Paratyndaris westcotti Nelson & Bellamy, 2004

References

Buprestidae genera